Estación Talca,  is a railway station of the Empresa de los Ferrocarriles del Estado, located in Talca, Chile. It is the main railway station in the Maule Region. It is located on 11 Oriente avenue.

Estación Talca is part of the Red Sur EFE, the TerraSur and the Expreso Maule inter-city services have a stop here.

Since 1915 the Ramal Constitución diverge from here, (with 2 trains daily on each direction), to the seaside city of Constitución.

The nearby Talca Bus Terminal is within walking distance from the Station.

Lines and trains 
The following lines and trains pass through or terminate at Estación Talca:

Red Sur EFE
TerraSur inter-city service (Alameda - Chillán)
Expreso Maule inter-city service (Alameda - Linares)
Ramal Constitución
Tren Regional Buscarril (Estación Talca - Estación Constitución)

Adjacent stations 

 Empresa de los Ferrocarriles del Estado
 Buscarril (Wikipedia)
 Buscarril (Tren Central)

Talca
Buildings and structures in Maule Region
Transport in Maule Region